The Bedford Plantation is a historic Southern plantation in Natchez, Adams County, Mississippi.

Location
It is located on Canonsburg Road, off U.S. Route 61, to the North East of Natchez, Mississippi. Coles Creek runs alongside the plantation.

History
The mansion on the plantation was built in the 1830s. It was added to the National Register of Historic Places on November 16, 1978.

References

Houses on the National Register of Historic Places in Mississippi
Houses in Natchez, Mississippi
National Register of Historic Places in Natchez, Mississippi